Lubcza  is a village in the administrative district of Gmina Więcbork, within Sępólno County, Kuyavian-Pomeranian Voivodeship, in north-central Poland.

The village has an approximate population of 200.

References

Lubcza